Unbreakable (1935–1952) was an American-bred, British-trained Thoroughbred racehorse and sire. He was successful on the racecourse, but some way below the best of his generation. His best wins came in the Richmond Stakes at Goodwood as a two-year-old and in the Victoria Cup Handicap two years later. After his retirement from racing he became a highly successful breeding stallion: through his grandson Native Dancer he appears in the pedigrees of most modern Thoroughbreds.

Background
Unbreakable was a black horse bred in the United States by his owner, Joseph E. Widener. He was sent to race in England, where he was trained by Cecil Boyd-Rochfort. The colt was sired by the British-bred stallion Sickle out of the French mare Blue Glass, making him a half-brother to the Belmont Stakes winner Hurryoff.

Racing career
As a two-year-old, Unbreakable won three races including the Richmond Stakes at Goodwood in July. In the following year he competed at the highest level, finishing fifth to Pasch in the 2000 Guineas and eighth behind Bois Roussel in The Derby.

Stud record
Unbreakable sired the Preakness Stakes winner Polynesian who in turn sired Native Dancer. One of the most highly rated American horses of the 20th century, Native Dancer was the grandsire of Mr. Prospector and the damsire of Northern Dancer. Unbreakable Died in 1952.

Pedigree 

Unbreakable is inbred 4 × 4 to Sainfoin and St. Simon, meaning those stallions appear twice in the fourth generation of his pedigree.

See also
 List of historical horses

References

1935 racehorse births
1952 racehorse deaths
Racehorses bred in Kentucky
Racehorses trained in the United Kingdom
Thoroughbred family 4-i